Hukam is a Punjabi word derived from the Arabic hukm, meaning "command" or "divine order." In Sikhism, Hukam represents the goal of becoming in harmony with the will of God and thus attaining inner peace.  It also designates the practice of opening up at random to a page in the Sikh scripture (Guru Granth Sahib) to receive God's guidance on how to handle a certain situation, as answer to a question, or as more general guidance for that day.

References

Sikh terminology
Sikh practices